The Ecclesiastical Leases Act 1572 (14 Eliz 1 c 11) was an Act of the Parliament of England.

The whole Act was repealed by section 1(1) of, and Group 1 of Part II of Schedule 1 to, the Statute Law (Repeals) Act 1998.

Section 5 earlier partial repeal
Here the words "masters or guardians of any hospital" and the words "and hospitals" were repealed (by virtue of section 48(2)) under Schedule 7 to the Charities Act 1960.

References
Halsbury's Statutes,

External links
The Ecclesiastical Leases Act 1572, as amended, from Legislation.gov.uk.
The Ecclesiastical Leases Act 1572, revised as of 1 February 1991, from Legislation.gov.uk.

Acts of the Parliament of England (1485–1603)
1572 in law
1572 in England